Deliceto is a small town and comune   in the province of Foggia, from which it is , in the Apulia region of southeast Italy. Adjacent towns are Ascoli Satriano (to the east); Bovino, Castelluccio dei Sauri (to the north and the north-west); Sant'Agata di Puglia (to the south); Candela (to the south-east); Accadia (to the south-west).

Deliceto rises on the peak of a hill, surrounded by woods and streams. Its name is due to the latin expression "Deo licet", i.e. "It is alright to God".

References

Cities and towns in Apulia